Acraea guichardi is a butterfly in the family Nymphalidae. It is found in Ethiopia.

Taxonomy
It is a member of the Acraea rahira species group-   but see also Pierre & Bernaud, 2014

References

Butterflies described in 1949
guichardi
Endemic fauna of Ethiopia
Butterflies of Africa